Jennifer Egelryd (born 25 July 1990) is a Swedish football forward who currently plays in the Damallsvenskan for AIK. She previously played for Piteå IF and Tyresö FF, from where she was loaned to Åland United of the Naisten Liiga and IK Sirius of the Elitettan.

Early life
Egelryd began playing football at the age of five where she played for Tyresö's youngest girls' team.

Playing career

Club
Egelryd made her debut for Tyresö FF at the age of 19 in a match against Djurgården in April 2010. She scored her first goal for the club in May during a match against AIK, in which Tyresö won 2-0. She finished the 2010 season having played in 19 matches, with 13 starts and 3 goals. After returning to Tyresö for the 2011 Damallsvenskan season, she made 6 starts in 13 appearances for a total of 546 minutes played. She scored two goals: one during a match against Jitex on 1 May in which Tyresö won 2-1 and another during a 3-0 win against Djurgården on 5 June.

In 2012, Egelryd made one appearance Tyresö and signed on loan with Finnish club, Åland United. She made four appearances for Åland and scored four goals. She returned for the remainder of the 2012 Damallsvenskan season to Tyresö where she made 29 appearances with two starts.

Egelryd returned to Tyresö for the 2013 season and made six appearances with one start before being signed on loan to IK Sirius FK in the Elitettan. In November 2013 Egelryd agreed to sign for Tyresö's Damallsvenskan rivals Piteå IF.

International
Egelryd represented Sweden at various youth levels including U-19, U-20 and U-23. In 2009, she helped Sweden win silver at the 2009 UEFA Women's U-19 Championship.

References

External links
 
 
 Tyresö FF player profile 
 

Swedish women's footballers
1990 births
Living people
Tyresö FF players
Piteå IF (women) players
AIK Fotboll (women) players
Damallsvenskan players
Kansallinen Liiga players
Åland United players
Expatriate women's footballers in Finland
Swedish expatriate women's footballers
Swedish expatriate sportspeople in Finland
Women's association football forwards
Elitettan players